Mataram may refer to:
Mataram Kingdom (716–1016), a Hindu-Buddhist kingdom in Java
Mataram Sultanate ( 1586–1755), a Javanese Islamic kingdom which later was a protectorate of Dutch East Indies
House of Mataram, dynasty or family that occupies the throne of the Mataram Sultanate
Mataram (city), a city on the Indonesian island of Lombok, the capital of West Nusa Tenggara province

See also
Selaparang Airport, alternatively Mataram Airport